In enzymology, an acylphosphatase is an enzyme that catalyzes the following chemical reaction:

Thus, the two substrates of this enzyme are acylphosphate and H2O, whereas its two products are carboxylate and phosphate.

Function
This enzyme belongs to the family of hydrolases, specifically those acting on acid anhydrides in phosphorus-containing anhydrides.  The systematic name of this enzyme class is acylphosphate phosphohydrolase. Other names in common use include acetylphosphatase, 1,3-diphosphoglycerate phosphatase, acetic phosphatase, Ho 1-3, and GP 1-3.

This enzyme participates in 3 metabolic pathways: 
 glycolysis / gluconeogenesis
 pyruvate metabolism, and 
 benzoate degradation via coa ligation.

Structural studies
Structures of this enzyme have been solved by both NMR and X-ray crystallography. See the links to PDB structures in the info boxes on the right for a current list of structures available in the PDB. The protein contains a beta sheet stacked on two alpha helices described by CATH as an Alpha-Beta Plait fold. The active site sits between sheet and helices and contains an arginine and an asparagine. Most structures are monomeric

Isozymes 
Humans express the following two acylphosphatase isozymes:

References

EC 3.6.1
Enzymes of known structure